Nadab ( Nāḏāḇ) was the second king of the northern Israelite Kingdom of Israel. He was the son and successor of Jeroboam.

Reign 
Nadab became king of Israel in the second year of Asa, King of Judah, and reigned for two years. William F. Albright has dated his reign to 901–900 BCE, while E. R. Thiele offers the dates 910–909 BCE.

In the second year of his reign, while they were besieging Gibbethon, a Philistine town in southern Dan, a conspiracy broke out in Nadab's army. He was slain by one of his own captains, Baasha, who then made himself king of Israel.

Having slain Nadab, Baasha put to death the remainder of the royal family. This was consistent with the prophecy given via Ahijah the Shilonite concerning the extinction of the entire House of Jeroboam.

References 

10th-century BC Kings of Israel
9th-century BC Kings of Israel
10th-century BC murdered monarchs
Year of birth unknown
Biblical murder victims
900s BC deaths
House of Jeroboam
Dethroned monarchs
Male murder victims